George Johannes Nunn (born 23 November 2001) is a professional footballer currently playing as a forward for Mickleover, on loan from Derby County. Born in England, he has represented the Republic of Ireland at youth international level.

Club career
Born in Crewe, Nunn started his career with local side Crewe Alexandra. He attracted attention from Premier League side Tottenham Hotspur in 2017, having scored a hat-trick against them at under-18 level. However, just a year later, Nunn rejected scholarship terms at Crewe Alexandra to join Premier League side Chelsea, who reportedly paid £300,000 in compensation. The move left Crewe Alexandra coaches somewhat taken aback, with then-manager David Artell stating that he was "fairly confident" that Nunn "would have played in our first team but there's no guarantee", while head of coaching, James Collins, saying "In my opinion he could have been around our first team in 12 month's time".

Nunn signed his first professional contract with Chelsea, a two-year deal, in February 2020. In January 2022, he was linked with a loan move away from the Blues, with clubs in Germany and the Netherlands reportedly interested. He was again linked with a move in July 2022, with Southampton and Derby County being the clubs linked.

Following a trial spell with Derby County, he signed for the Rams in July 2022. In October 2022, he moved to Southern Football League side Mickleover on a month-long loan deal. His loan spell got off to a good start, scoring on his debut against Barwell. He was loaned to Mickleover on another month-long loan in January 2023.

International career
Nunn is eligible to represent England, Germany and the Republic of Ireland at international level. He has played for the Republic of Ireland at under-19 level.

Personal life
Nunn wears shin pads with a photo of football manager Sean Dyche on them. Nunn himself explained that before games he would receive messages of support, along with pictures of Dyche, from his father, who shares a resemblance with the manager.

Career statistics

Club

References

2001 births
Living people
Sportspeople from Crewe
English people of Irish descent
English footballers
Republic of Ireland association footballers
Republic of Ireland youth international footballers
Association football forwards
Southern Football League players
Crewe Alexandra F.C. players
Chelsea F.C. players
Derby County F.C. players
Mickleover Sports F.C. players